Cartier is a community in the Canadian province of Ontario, located in the Sudbury District approximately  north of the northwestern city limits of Greater Sudbury along Highway 144.

Geography
A designated place administered by a local services board, Cartier had a population of 302 in the Canada 2006 Census. It is commonly considered to be part of Greater Sudbury's metropolitan area, but is not officially counted as such by Statistics Canada as it is not part of an incorporated municipality. Statistics Canada classifies the township as part of the Sudbury, Unorganized, North Part census subdivision.

History
In 1885 the community was known as Archer.  In 1888 it was officially named Cartier after the township, which was named to honour Sir George-Étienne Cartier (1814–1873), joint premier of the province of Canada with Sir John A. Macdonald from 1857 to 1862.  The township was named by surveyor H. B. Proudfoot.

Demographics 

Transportation
Prior to 1964, Cartier was the northern terminus of provincial highway 544 from Sudbury, which was renumbered as Highway 144 when it was extended northerly to Timmins.

Cartier station, a stop-on-request station, is served by Via Rail's Sudbury – White River train. Cartier is also a flag stop on Ontario Northland's motor coach service from Sudbury to Hearst.

References

Communities in Sudbury District
Designated places in Ontario
Geographic townships in Ontario
Local services boards in Ontario
1885 establishments in Canada